Aldershot is a town in Hampshire, England. The area is administered by Rushmoor Borough Council. The town has a population of 37,131, while the Aldershot Urban Area, a loose conurbation (which also includes other towns such as Camberley, Farnborough, and Farnham) has a population of 243,344, making it the thirtieth-largest urban area in the UK.

Aldershot is known as the "Home of the British Army", a connection which led to its rapid growth from a small village to a Victorian town.

History

Early history

The name may have derived from alder trees found in the area (from the Old English 'alder-holt' meaning copse of alder trees). Any settlement, though not mentioned by name, would have been included as part of the Hundred of Crondall referred to in the Domesday Book of 1086. The Church of St Michael the Archangel is the parish church for the town and dates to the 12th century with later additions. There was almost certainly an earlier church on the site. Cistercian monks from the nearby Waverley Abbey established granges or farms on their outlying estates, including one at Aldershot by 1175 for sheep grazing. We do not know when monks from the Abbey first came to Aldershot but the first documentary evidence is from 1287 when the Crondall Rental records that at 'Alreshate the Monks of Waverlye hold 31 acres of encroachment'. This area ran from the church of St Michael's down to the area around the present Brickfields Country Park while the grange itself was near the church. John Norden's map of Hampshire, published in the 1607 edition of William Camden's Britannia, indicates that Aldershot was a market town.

Prior to 1850, Aldershott was little known. The area was a vast stretch of common land, a lonely wasteland unsuitable for most forms of agriculture with scant population. As it existed at the time of the Domesday Survey in 1086, the extensive settlement of Crondall in the north-east corner of Hampshire was certainly Scandinavian, for among the customs of that great manor, which included Crondall, Yateley, Farnborough, and Aldershot, that of sole inheritance by the eldest daughter in default of sons prevailed, as over a large part of Cumberland, and this is a peculiarly Norse custom.

The first recorded mention of the manor of Aldershot is in 1573 in the will of Sir John White of Aldershot (c1512–1573), alderman of London and knighted when he became Lord Mayor of London (1563-4). He left Aldershot Manor to his son Sir Robert White of Aldershot (died 1599). He in turn left the manor to be divided between his two daughters, Ellen the wife of Sir Richard Tichborne and Mary, the wife of Sir Walter Tichborne, brother of Richard. The 18th-century jurist Charles Viner lived in the town and printed his A General Abridgment of Law and Equity on a press in his home. In the 18th century, the stretch of the London to Winchester turnpike that passed through Aldershot between Bagshot and Farnham (now known as the Farnborough Road) was the scene of highway robberies. At one time it had "almost as bad a reputation as Hounslow Heath". Dick Turpin is said to have operated in the area having his headquarters nearby in Farnborough, and there were sightings of Spring-heeled Jack.

Growth in the Victorian era
In 1854, at the time of the Crimean War, Aldershot Garrison was established as the first permanent training camp for the British Army. This led to a rapid expansion of Aldershot's population going from 875 in 1851, to in excess of 16,000 by 1861 (including about 9,000 from the military). Mrs Louisa Daniell arrived in the town at this time and set up her Soldier's Home and Institute to cater for the spiritual needs of the soldiers and their families. During this period Holy Trinity church, the Presbyterian church, the Wesleyan church and Rotunda chapel were built in the town centre to cater for the spiritual needs of the increasing numbers of troops in the nearby Camp and the growing civilian town. In August 1856 on her return from the Crimean War and "wishing to be with her sons in the Army" Mary Seacole with her business partner Thomas Day is said to arrived in Aldershot where they attempted to open a canteen. In her autobiography Seacole wrote. 'we set to bravely at Aldershott to retrieve our fallen fortunes, and stem off the ruin originated in the Crimea, but all in vain...'. The venture is believed to have failed through lack of funds and the two being declared bankrupt.

Aldershot Military Tattoo
The Aldershot Military Tattoo was an annual event dating back to 1894. In the 1920s and 1930s, the Aldershot Command Searchlight Tattoo held at the Rushmoor Arena presented displays from all branches of the services, including performances lit by flame torches. At one time the performances attracted crowds of up to 500,000 people. The Tattoo was organised to raise money for military charities. By the end of the 1930s the event was raising around £40,000 annually. The Tattoo's modern format, the Army Show, was cancelled in 2010 by the Ministry of Defence due to budget cuts. It was briefly revived the following year and attracted 20,000 visitors. In 2012, it was styled as the Aldershot Garrison Show, a smaller free event held on Armed Forces Day.

The Army Show was replaced in 2013 with a general Military Festival. Events were held across the town, including an art exhibition, live music, sports events and film screenings.

During the World Wars
In 1914 Aldershot had the largest army camp in the country with 20% of the British Army being based in and around the town. Aldershot was home for two Infantry Divisions and a Cavalry Brigade in addition to large numbers of artillery, engineers, service corps and medical services. At the start of World War I the units based at Aldershot became the 1st Corps of the British Expeditionary Force and soon tens of thousands of new recruits came to the large training centre in the Camp. This had a great effect on the civilian town as there was a great shortage of accommodation for the troops and many were billeted in local houses and schools. Aldershot played a vital role in the formation of Kitchener's Army, providing the core of the Army from 1914 onwards as well as treating the wounded brought back from the trenches in France and Flanders. The Cambridge Military Hospital was the first base hospital to receive casualties directly from the Western Front and it was here that plastic surgery was first performed in the British Empire by Captain Gillies (later Sir Harold Gillies). 

From 1939 to 1945 during World War II about 330,000 Canadian troops of the 1st, 2nd and 3rd Canadian Infantry Brigades passed through Aldershot for training before being deployed for the defence of the United Kingdom while much of the British Army was overseas. Additional units of the Canadian Army followed later creating the largest force of British Commonwealth troops ever to be stationed in the UK at one time. The Aldershot riot of July 1945 caused considerable damage to the town centre when disgruntled Canadian troops tired of waiting to be repatriated rioted in the streets for two evenings. In a gesture of forgiveness and goodwill the Freedom of the Borough of Aldershot was conferred on the Canadian Army on 26 September 1945 in a ceremony held at the town's recreation ground. In the following year Aldershot's military prison the 'Glasshouse' was burned down in prison riots.

Post War

A substantial rebuilding of the barracks was carried out between 1961 and 1969, by the architecture and engineering firm Building Design Partnership. The work was sped up under government pressure, and various new building technologies were employed with mixed success.

In 1974 Aldershot borough, which had been based at Aldershot Town Hall, merged with Farnborough urban district to form the Borough of Rushmoor under the provisions of the Local Government Act 1972.

After a 2009 campaign, the British Government allowed veteran Gurkha soldiers who had served for more than four years, and their families, to settle in the UK. The rise in the Nepalese population led Gerald Howarth, Conservative Member of Parliament for Aldershot, to request government assistance in expanding local public services to meet the needs of the growing population.

1972 Aldershot bombing

On 22 February 1972, Aldershot experienced the first in a series of mainland IRA attacks. Seven people, six of whom were civilian support staff, including five catering staff and a gardener were killed in a car bomb attack on the 16th Parachute Brigade headquarters mess. A further 19 people were injured. The bombing was claimed by the Official IRA as revenge for the Bloody Sunday massacre. The only army officer killed was Captain Gerry Weston a Catholic British Army chaplain. An area to be developed into a memorial garden was used to mark the 40th anniversary of the bombing in 2012.

Aldershot Military Town

Aldershot Military Town is located between Aldershot and North Camp near Farnborough. It is a garrison town that serves as the location for the military presence in the area. It houses Aldershot Garrison's married quarters, barracks, Army playing fields and other sporting facilities. The military town includes some local landmarks, such as the Aldershot Observatory, Aldershot Military Cemetery, the Union Building, the Royal Garrison Church and other churches. Until 1993, the town served as headquarters for the Royal Corps of Transport and the Army Catering Corps, until they were merged into the Royal Logistic Corps and moved to Princess Royal Barracks, Deepcut.

Queen Victoria and Prince Albert showed a keen interest in the establishment and development of Aldershot as a garrison town in the 1850s, at the time of the Crimean War. They had a wooden Royal Pavilion built, where they would often stay when attending reviews of the army. In 1860 Albert established and endowed the Prince Consort's Library, which still exists today. To celebrate Queen Victoria's Diamond Jubilee in 1897, 25,000 British and Colonial soldiers marched from Laffan's Plain near Farnborough, reviewed by Queen Victoria. Beside the British soldiers marched men from Canada, India, Africa, Australia and New Zealand.

Aldershot Military Town comes under its own military jurisdiction. It was home to the Parachute Regiment from its formation in 1940 until it moved to Colchester Garrison in 2003. Many famous people have been associated with the Military Town, including Charlie Chaplin, who made his first stage appearance in The Canteen theatre aged 5 in 1894, and Winston Churchill, who was based there in the late 19th century during his time in the Army.

The area also houses various military and regimental museums, including the Aldershot Military Museum, housed in a red-brick Victorian barracks. Until December 2007 the Parachute Regiment and Airborne Forces Museum was in Aldershot. It has since moved to the Imperial War Museum Duxford. The RAMC Memorial to the 314 men of the Royal Army Medical Corps who lost their lives in the Boer War of 1899-1902 is located at the top of Gun Hill.

An outline planning application has been agreed for the redevelopment of some of the former Military Town. The Aldershot Urban Extension will bring some 3,850 new homes, two new primary schools, a children's day-care centre, additional secondary school places, community facilities, waste recycling and landscaping to an area of 150 hectares.

In 2013, the MoD announced a £100 million investment to expand Aldershot Garrison and bring 750 more service personnel and their families to settle in Aldershot.

Landmarks

Wellington Statue

A statue of the first Duke of Wellington mounted on his horse, Copenhagen, is situated on Round Hill behind the Royal Garrison Church. It was designed and built by Matthew Cotes Wyatt who used recycled bronze from cannons that were captured at the Battle of Waterloo. It took thirty men over three years to finish the project.

Originally, in 1846, the statue was erected at Hyde Park Corner, London on the Wellington Arch. However, Decimus Burton, architect of the arch, had tried to veto this plan for his preferred "figure in a four horse chariot". Many agreed with Decimus Burton that the statue looked ridiculous since it was out of proportion. It was nicknamed "The Archduke" and was a popular topic in the satirical magazine Punch.

Queen Victoria claimed that the statue ruined the view of the skyline from Buckingham Palace, and she privately proposed that the statue be moved. The Duke, who had only sat for the sculptor on two or three occasions, suddenly became very attached to the statue and would not consider its removal from its arch.

In 1885, the Prince of Wales handed over the monument to Lieutenant General Anderson, the commander of the Aldershot Garrison.

Aldershot Observatory

The observatory is a circular red-brick building with a domed roof and it stands on Queen's Avenue. Inside is a telescope, 8-inch refractor, mounted on a German-type equatorial mount with a clockwork drive. The telescope and observatory building were a gift from aviation pioneer Patrick Young Alexander to the British Army, a fact which is recorded by a plaque near the observatory door. It reads: "Presented to the Aldershot Army Corps by Patrick Y Alexander Esq 1906".

The Wesleyan Church

The former Wesleyan church on Grosvenor Road has a 100-foot tower that can be seen for miles around the town and which is described as " the only significant tower in the town". Opened in 1877, the church served the Methodists of Aldershot for over 100 years and could seat 1,150 people until its closure in 1988. Today the original complex of church, Soldiers' Home and Hall has been converted into offices, a dental surgery, gymnasium and homes.

Aldershot Buddhist Centre

Aldershot Buddhist Centre is a Buddhist temple and community centre catering for the Buddhists of Aldershot and surrounding area which is billed as the United Kingdom's first Buddhist community centre. With the influx of large numbers of Nepalis into the area in recent years giving Rushmoor the largest Buddhist community in the United Kingdom, a need for a temple and community centre to cater for their spiritual and secular needs was required. The Centre was formally opened on the High Street by the 14th Dalai Lama in June 2015.

Union Building

When a small party of NCOs and men of the Royal Engineers arrived in November 1853 in the area that is today Princes Gardens they were the first soldiers to arrive in Aldershot. At this time the area was heathland with the only building in sight being the Union Poor House, built in 1629 as a sub-manor for the Tichborne family and later used as the local workhouse and a school. It was one of five permanent local buildings purchased by the War Department in 1854 as part of the development of the new Aldershot Camp, and was used by the Army from 1854 to 1879 as No 2 Station Hospital. In later years it saw a variety of uses before being redeveloped as flats.

Transport and communications
Aldershot is close to several major roads, including the M3, and the A3. Its nearest dual-carriageway roads are the A31 to its south, heading east towards Guildford and the A3, and the A331 to its east, heading north towards Farnborough and the M3.

Farnborough Airport is 5 miles away, Heathrow is 29 miles, and Gatwick is 43 miles away.

Aldershot railway station and bus station are both situated off Station Road. From the railway station, South Western Railway run services to London Waterloo, Alton, Guildford and Ascot.

Aldershot bus station is the terminus for many bus services in the Aldershot Urban Area; it also services buses from further afield.

Bus services from Aldershot are provided by Stagecoach South. National Express coach services operate between London Victoria and Portsmouth twice a day.

Education

There are various schools in Aldershot. These will be joined by two new primary schools being built as part of the Aldershot Urban extension development of 3,850 houses. This development will also be served by a further 675 secondary school places being created at the Alderwood and Wavell schools.

A mix of infants and juniors, including Park Primary School and St Michael's (C of E). The infant schools are Talavera, Wellington Primary, and Bell Vue Infant School. Junior schools include: Newport County, Talavera, Wellington Secondary and St Joseph's Primary (Catholic). Aldershot has only one secondary school, Alderwood School (formerly Heron Wood School and The Connaught School) though Ash Manor School, Farnham Heath End School, All Hallows Catholic School and The Wavell School are all local. In the town's West End can be found Rowhill School, a special school for students of secondary age unable to attend mainstream schooling for a variety of reasons. There are also two private schools, Salesian College and Farnborough Hill School in nearby Farnborough.

Leisure and recreation

Following the demolition of the Theatre Royal and Hippodrome theatres in 1959 and 1961, the local council opened its own Princes Hall in 1973 as an entertainment venue. Another entertainment venue and arts centre is the West End Centre on Queens Road which is popular for small-scale theatre, music and comedy.

Music and dance

Hardcore
The Palace (previously The Palace Cinema, The Rhythm Station, Cheeks, Vox), influenced the rapid growth of the hardcore scene from 1992 to 1995. Weekly events included Fusion (Hectic Records), Tazmania, Slammin' Vinyl and Future World. The club also groomed local talents such as DJ Sharkey, DJ Mystery, DJ Sy, DJ Unknown, Vinylgroover, DJ NS, Hixxy, MC Freestyle, MC Young, MC Smiley and Spyder MC. The location of Aldershot between Southampton and London meant the club became a mecca for Hardcore and it was regularly sold out during this time. At the height of the club's popularity, a teenager's death from a suspected overdose of ecstasy was the catalyst that saw dance music leaving the club and had a negative impact on the hardcore dance scene in the Aldershot area.

The Beatles in Aldershot

Sam Leach, their then agent, and wanting to become their manager, attempted to introduce the Beatles to London agents by promoting shows at The Palais Ballroom, on the corner of Perowne Street and Queens Road in Aldershot on 9 December 1961. Leach wanted to organise a 'battle of the bands' between The Beatles and Ivor Jay and the Jaywalkers from London. The show was not advertised properly and, as a result, only 18 people attended. The local newspaper, The Aldershot News, failed to publish Leach's advertisement for the show. In addition, Ivor Jay and the Jaywalkers failed to appear. However, the band and friends had their own fun after the show, drinking ale, playing football with bingo balls and dancing the foxtrot. The noise became so loud that a neighbour called the police who shut the event down. When interviewed in 1983 about the Aldershot gig Paul McCartney described it as "the night we couldn’t get arrested, but it wasn’t for the lack of trying". After the gig the band went on to London to join an after hours jam at the Blue Gardenia Club. Weeks after this Brian Epstein became the group's manager.

Rock music

At the end of the 1990s and the start of the 2000s, an underground scene of rock bands cropped up around Aldershot. Notable bands include Reuben, Vex Red, Inter and Hundred Reasons.

Shopping

Union Street and Wellington Street at the centre of the town's shopping district were pedestrianised in the 1970s when the Wellington Centre, a covered shopping centre, was built over the site of the town's former open-air market.

During the 1980s and 1990s the Victorian shopping arcade and various other period buildings in Wellington Street were demolished to allow for the building of an extension to the Wellington Centre known as The Galleries. The Galleries has remained almost vacant for many years now and is currently under consideration for proposed redevelopment into a mixed use retail and residential scheme, with potential commercial leisure space. In 2003, a health check of the town centre concluded that, "Aldershot is experiencing promising signs of revitalisation, particularly in the shopping core". This revitalisation failed to materialise, with prominent traders such as Marks and Spencer leaving the town centre.

In 2005, Rushmoor Borough Council documented the percentage of vacant shops at 10%, 8% and 7% respectively for Union Street, the Wellington Centre and Wellington Street.

The Westgate Leisure Park, which opened in 2012–2013 and which fronts onto Barrack Road, includes a Cineworld cinema, a Morrisons supermarket, and several chain restaurants, including Nando's, Mimosa and Pizza Express. There is also a Tesco superstore located at the rear of the development.

Parks and open spaces

Aldershot has many parks, playgrounds and open spaces for sport, play and leisure, including Aldershot Park, Brickfields Country Park, the Municipal Gardens, Manor Park and the Princes Gardens, the latter three a short walk from the town centre.

The legacy of the Army has meant that the land for leisure use, as well as protected areas for flora and fauna, has been preserved over many years. On the Surrey border can be found Rowhill Nature Reserve which is popular with nature-lovers, dog owners, walkers and joggers.

Sport
Aldershot has many sports facilities including the Rushmoor Gymnastics Academy, Aldershot Tennis Centre, Aldershot Bowling, Aldershot Pools and Lido, Aldershot Garrison Sports Centre, Alderwood Leisure Centre (formerly Connaught Leisure Centre) and Alpine Snow Sports (Dry Ski Centre). Formerly the town also hosted short circuit motor racing including speedway and stock car racing. Greyhound racing took place at Aldershot Stadium, and point-to-point racing at Tweseldown. Famous running club AFD has produced top runners. Aldershot Park hosts a number of sports facilities and organisations.

Athletics
Aldershot is home to arguably the most successful athletics club in British and European history, Aldershot, Farnham & District A.C. The club has produced many Olympians including Roger Hackney, Zola Budd, Lily Partridge and Steph Twell and specialises in middle–long distance running. The home of AFD, as it is commonly known, is the Aldershot Military Stadium, Aldershot. Blackwater Valley Runners are a social running club and organise many local races.

Swimming
Opened in 1930, Aldershot Lido is a traditional outdoor leisure pool that contains 1.5 million gallons of water situated on a  site. The original land was a lake that had become overgrown with weeds. It was bought by the Borough Council in 1920 for £21,000 and was the focus of the council's improvement projects for the town. The Lido became an Olympic venue in 1948 when it was the site of the swimming event in the Modern Pentathlon of that year's London Olympic Games. The pool has extensive areas of shallow water for children to play including a large fountain at the centre. It also has a diving area and water slides. There is an adjoining 25 m indoor pool that allows all year round swimming.

Football

The local professional football team is Aldershot Town who compete in the Football Conference. Before 1992 the local club was Aldershot, which folded on 25 March 1992, while playing in the Football League Fourth Division. The current club was formed shortly afterwards and achieved five promotions in its first 16 seasons to return to the Football League in 2008. The previous Aldershot club's biggest success arguably came in 1987, just five years before closure, when they became the first team to win the Football League Fourth Division promotion play-offs, at the expense of a far bigger club – Wolverhampton Wanderers.

Since 1927, the main football ground in the town, and home of both teams, is the Recreation Ground, also known as "The Rec". It has a capacity for 7,100, of which 2,000 can be seated.

A number of successful current and former footballers are from the Aldershot area, including Johnny Berry, who was born in the town in 1926. He played for Birmingham City and Manchester United before his playing career was ended by injuries sustained in the Munich air disaster on 6 February 1958. He had won three league title medals with Manchester United. He later returned to Aldershot to run a sports shop with his brother Peter. He continued to live locally until he died in September 1994, at the age of 68.

Other footballers born in Aldershot include Craig Maskell (a striker for clubs including Southampton, Swindon Town and Reading) during the 1980s and 1990s, and Bruce Rioch. Rioch played for clubs including Luton Town, Aston Villa and Derby County before managing clubs including Middlesbrough and Arsenal, but played for the Scotland team during the 1970s due to his ancestry. Another player from the area is Joe Ralls who played youth football for Aldershot Town FC and currently plays for EFL Championship side Cardiff City FC. Another former notable player is current Burnley Goalkeeper Nick Pope. Pope was at Aldershot on loan from Charlton at the time.

On 25 October 2011 Aldershot Town played Manchester United at the Recreation Ground in the League Cup 4th round losing 3–0, their most successful run to date in the Carling Cup.

Cricket
Aldershot Cricket Club is based in Aldershot Park in the town and plays in the Thames Valley Cricket League. Army cricket matches have been played at the Officers Club Services Ground, which has also played host to home matches for Hampshire County Cricket Club. Many of these matches held first-class status.

Hockey
Aldershot Cricket Club shares facilities with the successful Aldershot & Farnham Hockey Club who, in 2022, were looking for a more permanent base.

Rugby union
Formerly known as Fleet RUFC, the club started in 1991 as a pub side. The club was renamed Aldershot and Fleet RUFC (A&F or the Stags) after their move in 2003 from Farnborough to their current home, Aldershot Park. With an ever-expanding juniors section, Aldershot & Fleet were successful in winning the coveted RFU "Seal of Approval" Club of the Year 2008 for the southern region. They now play in the Hampshire 2 league. The club also hosts a Rugby League Vet's team for over 35's.

Greyhound racing
Greyhound racing took place regularly at the now closed Aldershot Stadium in Tongham during the 1950s.

Stock car racing

Aldershot Stadium was located in Oxenden Road, Tongham and staged Stock Car racing for the first time on 30 October 1954. Together with other short-circuit formulae (including Superstox, Hot Rods, Bangers and Midgets) racing was held regularly (every Thursday evening, every Boxing Day afternoon and later on Saturdays).

The racing took place initially on a loose shale track inside the greyhound track; after Motorcycle speedway racing at the venue ceased the shale track was replaced with a hard tarmaced surface. The track was home to the Aldershot Knights for National League team racing in 1966 and again in 1971 and 1972.

The site was the headquarters for the promoter, Spedeworth International ltd. Major national events at the track were few and far between – the most notable title race contested there being the 1975 British Superstox Championship (27 Sep 1975, won by Steve Monk).

The final meeting at Oxenden Road took place on 21 November 1992. Immediately after this date the site was cleared for construction of the A331 Blackwater Valley Road, which forms a by-pass for Aldershot and Farnborough.

Now, short-circuit motor sport takes place in Aldershot again, at the Aldershot Raceway, Pegasus Village, Rushmoor Arena. Founded and named by local man and ex short circuit racing driver Malcolm Roberts, his wife Gwen and their children in memory of and following the death of their eldest son, also Malcolm, a short circuit motor racing enthusiast. The site is now operated by Spedeworth, whilst the Roberts family relocated to a new circuit in Aldermaston, West Berkshire.

Speedway racing
Circa 1929, a track operated at a stadium in Boxalls Lane. Speedway returned to Aldershot in 1950 at the local greyhound stadium. The Shots featured in the lower echelons of the sport up to 1960.

Olympics
Aldershot hosted three of the five events in the modern pentathlon at the 1948 London Olympics. The swimming was held in Aldershot Lido, Maida Gymnasium hosted the fencing, and the cross-country equestrian event was held at Tweseldown. All of the Olympic equestrian events, excluding the Prix des Nations, were also held at Aldershot. It was announced on 15 January 2008 that the Aldershot Military Town had been chosen as the official training camp for the British Olympic team ahead of the 2012 Olympic Games in London. However, in April 2010, it was announced that Team GB would be training at Loughborough University.

Media
The local press is the Aldershot News & Mail, a Surrey Advertiser Group broadsheet. At the end of November 2017, the Surrey-Hants Star Courier, a free tabloid, ceased publication. The local BBC TV news is BBC South Today. Aldershot is covered on BBC radio by BBC Surrey (which covers Surrey & North-East Hampshire on 104.6FM). The Independent Local Radio stations was 96.4 Eagle Radio, broadcasting contemporary music, until it was purchased by Bauer Media in 2019 along with other stations in the UKRD group. from September 2020; Eagle Radio become Greatest Hits Radio. BFBS Radio also broadcasts from a studio on Middle Hill on 102.5FM as part of its UK Bases network.

Politics

Aldershot is divided into the following wards:

Rushmoor Borough Council
Rowhill: southwest of the town has three Conservative councillors.
Wellington: west of the town together with the northern half of the town centre, combines the most compact urban parts of the town northern part of the town centre, much of the military town and a very large acreage of unpopulated woodlands, forests and heathland. It has two Labour councillors and one Conservative councillor.
Manor Park: south of the town and the southern half of the town centre has three Conservative councillors.
Aldershot Park: southeast of the town has three Labour councillors.
North Town: northeast of the town has three Labour councillors.
St Marks: north of the town and parts of Farnborough has three Conservative councillors.

Hampshire County Council
Aldershot North: the north west of the town has one Labour councillor.
Aldershot South: the south east of the town has one Conservative councillor.

As of the May 2018 Rushmoor Borough Council Elections and the May 2017 Hampshire County Council Elections, of the 20 seats on Rushmoor Borough Council and Hampshire County Council covering Aldershot, the Conservatives hold 12 and Labour hold 8.

Member of Parliament
The town is represented in Parliament through the Aldershot constituency. The current MP is Leo Docherty, Conservative.

Climate
Aldershot is a Cfb according to the Köppen climate classification.

Notable people from Aldershot

Eve Stratford, Playboy Club Bunny who was the victim of one of Britain's unsolved murders in 1975.
Martin Freeman, actor in The Office, The Hobbit, and Sherlock.
Ian McEwan, novelist
Ben Norris (comedian), stand up comedian, who has appeared on Mock the Week and Never Mind the Buzzcocks.
Arthur English, actor and comedian, in honour of whom there is now a blue plaque at 22 Lysons Road.
Amelle Berrabah, singer, songwriter and former member of the Sugababes.
Russell Foster, professor of circadian neuroscience and Nicholas Kurti Senior Fellow at Brasenose College at the University of Oxford
John Lucarotti, screenwriter.
Joel Freeland, professional basketball player, having played for both the Portland Trail Blazers and CSKA Moscow.
Holly Aird, actress known for her role in Waking The Dead.
Alfred Toye, Aldershot-born recipient of the Victoria Cross during World War I
DanTDM (Daniel Robert Middleton), YouTube personality, professional gamer, and author.
James Wade, professional darts player on the PDC
Alex Reid, mixed martial arts fighter and ex-husband of Katie Price.
Joe Jopling, professional footballer.
Johnny Berry, Manchester United footballer and 'Busby Babe'.

Location filming

The barrack scenes in the 1968 film The Charge of the Light Brigade starring David Hemmings and Trevor Howard were filmed at the old West Cavalry Barracks (now largely demolished). The gates of the South Cavalry Barracks stood in as the prison gates for the 1960 film Two-Way Stretch starring Peter Sellers, Wilfrid Hyde-White and Lionel Jeffries.

The area was used for location filming of the 1970 Doctor Who serial The Ambassadors of Death.

Due to its architecture, Bruneval Barracks in Montgomery Lines was chosen as the location for snowy scenes in Kazan, Russia at the end of the 2009 James Bond film Quantum of Solace. Parts of Aldershot's military training area were also used for the opening sequence in the 2002 James Bond film Die Another Day.

The Montgomery Lines were again used for Brad Pitt's film World War Z based on the novel by Max Brooks.

Twin towns – sister cities

Rushmoor is twinned with:
 Dayton, Ohio, United States (since 2019)
 Gorkha Municipality, Nepal (since 2020)
 Meudon, France (since 1974)
 Oberursel, Germany (since 1989)
 Rzeszów, Poland (since 2019)
 Sulechów, Poland (since 2001)

See also

List of army barracks around Aldershot
Aldershot Military Cemetery
Aldershot Cemetery, the town's civil cemetery
Aldershot Crematorium
St Joseph's Church, Aldershot
Church of St Michael the Archangel
Holy Trinity Church, Aldershot
Wesleyan Church, Aldershot
Murders of Ann Lee and Margaret Johnson

References

External links

Rushmoor Borough Council
The Aldershot Tattoo (Web archive)
The Aldershot Civic Society
Aldershot Military Museum
Aldershot Library Military Collection
Brickfields Country Park

 
Towns in Hampshire
Venues of the 1948 Summer Olympics
Olympic equestrian venues
Military in Hampshire
Towns with cathedrals in the United Kingdom
Unparished areas in Hampshire
Rushmoor
Populated places established in the 11th century
1086 establishments in England